John Partridge may refer to:
John Partridge (artist) (1789–1872), British portrait painter
John Partridge (astrologer) (1644–1710s), English astrologer
John Partridge (actor) (born 1971), English actor, singer and dancer
John Bernard Partridge (1861–1945), British illustrator, nephew of the artist
John Slater Partridge (1870–1926), U.S. federal judge 
John Nelson Partridge (1838–1920), police commissioner in Brooklyn and New York City
John Partridge (footballer) (born 1962), English footballer
J. Colin Partridge (born 1949), American pediatrician and neonatologist

See also 
John Partridge House, historic house in Millis, Massachusetts